Vlad VII Vintilă de la Slatina (died 1535) was a Wallachian nobleman who reigned as the principality's voivode from 1532 to 1535. He was assassinated during a hunting expedition near Craiova.

References

 

1535 deaths
Rulers of Wallachia
16th-century rulers in Europe
Assassinated heads of state
Year of birth unknown